Neutron is a subatomic particle.

Neutron may also refer to:

In physics

 Neutron bomb
 Neutron-degenerate matter
 Neutron matter
 Neutron star

In fiction
 
 Neutron (comics), the name given to three comic book characters:
 Neutron (DC Comics), a DC Comics character
 Neutron (Linus), an Italian comics character that appeared in Linus
 Neutron (Marvel Comics), a Marvel Comics character
 Neutron Solstice, the third book in the Deathlands series
 "Neutron Star" (short story), a short story by Larry Niven
 Mr Neutron, character from Monty Python's Flying Circus
 Neutron, cat from the film This Island Earth

Other uses
 Neutron (bot), an XMPP bot written in Python using xmpppy library
 Neutron (game), an abstract strategy game
 Neutron (formerly Quantum), a software system for managing virtualized network topologies in the OpenStack cloud computing platform
 Rocket Lab Neutron, a medium-lift launch vehicle under development by Rocket Lab

See also

 Jimmy Neutron (disambiguation)
 Neutronium, state of matter, proposed element, fictional material
 Neutron Dance, a 1980s song by The Pointer Sisters